Sărătenii Vechi is a commune in Telenești District, Moldova. It is composed of two villages, Sărătenii Vechi and Zahareuca.

Notable people
 Vasile Anestiade
 Boris Focșa
 Ludmila Balan

References

Communes of Telenești District